Abbi Aitken-Drummond (born 11 April 1991) is a Scottish international cricketer. She plays for the Scotland Women cricket team where she is a right-handed batsman and right arm medium pace bowler. She was one of the youngest members of the team for ICC World Cup Qualifiers in Stellenbosch in 2008.

She was the captain of her national team. She led Scotland to 2015 ICC Women's World Twenty20 Qualifier where they came fourth. On 31 October 2017, she stood down as captain of the national team.

In June 2018, she was named in Scotland's squad for the 2018 ICC Women's World Twenty20 Qualifier tournament. She made her Women's Twenty20 International (WT20I) for Scotland against Uganda in the World Twenty20 Qualifier on 7 July 2018.

In August 2019, she was named in Scotland's squad for the 2019 ICC Women's World Twenty20 Qualifier tournament in Scotland. In January 2022, she was named in Scotland's team for the 2022 Commonwealth Games Cricket Qualifier tournament in Malaysia.

Aitken-Drummond identifies as bisexual. She married former Scotland player Annette Drummond in June 2019.

References

External links
 profile on ESPN Cricinfo
 profile on Cricketarchive

1991 births
Living people
Scottish women cricketers
Scottish women cricket captains
Scotland women Twenty20 International cricketers
Cricketers from Dundee
Bisexual women
Bisexual sportspeople
Scottish LGBT sportspeople
Scottish bisexual people
LGBT cricketers
21st-century Scottish LGBT people